Jackie Bernard Harris (born January 4, 1968) is an American former professional football player who was a tight end in the National Football League (NFL) for the Green Bay Packers, Tampa Bay Buccaneers, Tennessee Oilers / Titans and Dallas Cowboys. He played college football at what is now known as the University of Louisiana at Monroe.

Early years
Harris attended Dollarway High School, where he played football and basketball, and ran track. He was a two-way player at wide receiver and defensive back. As a senior, he helped lead the team to the state finals and earned all-state honors.

Harris accepted a football scholarship from the Northeast Louisiana Indians (now the University of Louisiana at Monroe). As a sophomore, he became a starter at tight end, catching passes from future NFL quarterback Stan Humphries. They were members of the team that won the 1987 NCAA Division I-AA Football Championship Game. As a junior, Harris missed half the season with a knee injury, posting 43 receptions for 512 yards and two touchdowns. He had a school and conference record with 16 receptions against Lamar University. As a senior, he collected 54 receptions for 661 yards and seven touchdowns. He finished as the school's all-time leading receiver with 147 receptions for 2,107 yards and 14 touchdowns.

Professional career

Green Bay Packers
Harris was selected by the Green Bay Packers in the fourth round (102nd overall) of the 1990 NFL Draft. In 1991, he was fourth on the team with 24 receptions for 264 yards and three touchdowns while making 6 starts in two tight end formations.

In 1992, he became a full-time starter until the seventh game of the season and still registered 55 receptions, which ranked second on the team and second in the NFL for tight ends. He received NFC Offensive Player of the Week after tallying 5 catches for 128 yards (team record for tight ends), including a career-long 66-yard touchdown, against the Denver Broncos.

The next year despite missing 4 games with a left meniscus tear, he tallied 42 receptions, finishing second on the team in receiving behind Sterling Sharpe for the second year in a row. His knee injury forced him to miss 2 playoff games.

On June 22, 1994, Harris signed a 4-year, $7.6 million contract with the Tampa Bay Buccaneers as a restricted free agent, becoming the NFL's highest-paid tight end by annual average salary. Although the Packers had the option, they eventually decided not to match the offer.

Tampa Bay Buccaneers
In 1994, he was limited to only 9 games, after suffering a shoulder subluxation against the Chicago Bears and being placed on the injured reserve list on November 22. At the time of his injury, he was second in receptions among NFC tight ends.

In 1995, he started 16 games for the first time in his career, recording career-highs with 62 receptions (team record for tight ends) for 751 yards. Against the Green Bay Packers, he established a new club record for receptions by a tight end with 10 catches for 122 yards.

In 1996, Tony Dungy became the team's new head coach and installed a run-oriented offense, which caused his production to decline over the next two years. 

In 1997, he missed four games with a groin injury, returning in the playoffs against the Detroit Lions. He was placed on the injured reserve list before the divisional playoff game against the Green Bay Packers, due to complications from his recent hernia surgery.

Tennessee Oilers / Titans
On March 11, 1998, he signed as a free agent with the Tennessee Oilers, finishing second on the team with 43 receptions for 412 yards and 2 touchdowns. 

In 1999, his 14 postseason receptions for a team-high 117 yards, tied for the team lead in postseason receptions. Harris started in a 2 tight end formation in Super Bowl XXXIV, although they would lose to the Kurt Warner-led St. Louis Rams.

Dallas Cowboys
Harris signed with the Dallas Cowboys as a free agent on March 17, 2000. He was given Michael Irvin old number #88. Although he was just expected to replace backup Eric Bjornson and complement tight end David LaFleur, after wide receivers Joey Galloway and Raghib Ismail were lost for the season, Harris became an integral part of the offense, lining up at different positions, while finishing first on the team in touchdown catches (5), second in receptions (39) and third in receiving yards (306). In 2001, LaFleur was waived injured and he became the team's starter at tight end.

After completing two years of a four-year contract, Harris was released by the team on February 28, 2002 to "create salary cap room", effectively ending his NFL career.

Personal life
In October 1996, Harris purchased KPBA (1270 AM), a Christian radio station operated by a local Baptist church. By 1999, he would expand his media holdings to three radio stations, all playing a Christian radio format.

In June 2001, Jackie Harris and his wife Letrece were honored for their "commitment to downtown Pine Bluff" as Small Business Persons of the Year by the Greater Pine Bluff Chamber of Commerce.

References

External links
Harris Maintains Low-key Approach

1968 births
Living people
Sportspeople from Pine Bluff, Arkansas
Players of American football from Arkansas
American football tight ends
Louisiana–Monroe Warhawks football players
Green Bay Packers players
Tampa Bay Buccaneers players
Tennessee Oilers players
Tennessee Titans players
Dallas Cowboys players